This is a complete list of New York State Historic Markers in Bronx County, New York.

Listings county-wide

See also
List of New York State Historic Markers
National Register of Historic Places listings in the Bronx
List of National Historic Landmarks in New York City

References

Bronx
History of the Bronx
Bronx-related lists